The Milky Way is the galaxy that contains the Solar System.

Milky Way may also refer to:

Places
 Milky Way (Antarctica), a col in Antarctica
 Via Lattea ("Milky Way"), a winter sports area in the Italian and French Alps

Arts, entertainment, and media

Films
 The Milky Way (1922 film), a silent film directed by W. S. Van Dyke
 The Milky Way (1936 film), a Harold Lloyd film
 The Milky Way (1940 film), an MGM cartoon
 The Milky Way (1969 film), a film directed by Luis Buñuel
 Milky Way (2000 film) (Mliječni put), a 2000 Bosnian film
 The Milky Way (2007 film) (A via láctea), by Lina Chamie (Brazil), featured at the 2007 Cannes Film Festival

Music
 MilkyWay, a Japanese girl group created as a tie-in to the anime Kirarin Revolution
 "Milky Way" (Syd Barrett song), a song by Syd Barrett
 "Milky Way" (BoA song), a song by BoA from Double
 Milky Way (album), an album by Bas
 "Milky Way", a song by Loudness from Disillusion
 "Milky Way", a jazz track by Marcus Miller from Free
 "Milky Way", a 1975 song by Sheer Elegance
 "Milky Way", a song by VIXX from VIXX 2016 Conception Ker
 Wintergatan ("Milky Way"), a Swedish band

Other arts, entertainment, and media
 Milky Way, a 1999 television commercial by Volkswagen featuring the song "Pink Moon"
 Milkyway Image, a Hong Kong feature film production company
 The Milky Way (novel), the UK publication of Jean Dutourd's novel The Best Butter

Brands and enterprises
 Milky Way (chocolate bar), a brand of chocolate bar
 Milky Way (spread), a brand of chocolate spread
 Melkweg (Dutch for "Milky Way"), a music venue and cultural center in Amsterdam
 The Milky Way (amusement park), an amusement park in Clovelly, Devon, England

Other uses
 Milky Way (mythology), myths and legends about the origin of the Milky Way

 MilkyWay@home, a distributed computing astronomy project